Osborne Earl "Nikko" Smith Jr. (born April 28, 1982) is a singer-songwriter who was the ninth-place finalist of Season 4 on American Idol.

Biography
Nikko Smith, the son of Baseball Hall of Famer Ozzie Smith, is currently working on an album entitled The Revolution.

On October 26, 2006, Smith performed "The Star-Spangled Banner" prior to Game 4 of the World Series, at the home field of the St. Louis Cardinals for whom his father had played 15 seasons.

American Idol
Smith auditioned for American Idol in 2005 with the song "All I Do" by Stevie Wonder. Smith made it to the third round of the semi-finals, but was voted off on March 9 along with Travis Tucker.

Days later, Smith got a phone call from the producers asking him to come back in place of Mario Vazquez, who left for "family reasons". After returning, Nikko was dubbed "The Comeback Kid" by judge Paula Abdul after a performance of "One Hand, One Heart". However, in the same week, Nikko was voted off the show, placing ninth overall.

American Idol performances

: Nikko was originally eliminated in a semi-finals results show, He was called back after Mario Vazquez withdrew from the show and he replaced Mario on the final 12.

References

External links
nikkosmith.com

1982 births
Singers from Missouri
American Idol participants
American rhythm and blues musicians
Living people
People from St. Louis County, Missouri
21st-century African-American male singers